Fritz and Friederike is a 1952 West German comedy film directed by Géza von Bolváry and starring Liselotte Pulver, Albert Lieven, and Margarete Haagen. It was made at the Wiesbaden Studios in Hesse. The film's sets were designed by the art directors Heinrich Beisenherz and Alfred Bütow.

Plot 
Mönchheim, owner of a riding school, had his ward Friederike raised to become a "Fritz" according to strictly male standards. This female Fritz can ride horses and is adept at fencing, swearing and drinking. He even wins a chase race against cavalry officer Henry de Voss.

With a heavy heart Friederike is then sent to a girls' boarding school by her uncle. There she causes all sorts of confusion and flees disguised as a boy. She smuggles herself into a barracks of the operetta-like Sonn-Schein-Armee, which, among other things, is equipped with individual women's service. There she meets her tournament opponent again, who falls in love with her when he accidentally sees her in women's clothing. He sees through their game and puts them in a number of tricky situations. So Friederike discovers her feminine side after all, so that her lover can win her over completely.

Cast

References

Bibliography
 Knop, Matthias. Rote Rosen und weisser Flieder: die Blütezeit der Filmstadt Wiesbaden. Museum Wiesbaden, 1995.

External links

1952 comedy films
German comedy films
West German films
Films directed by Géza von Bolváry
Cross-dressing in film
German black-and-white films
1950s German films
1950s German-language films